Eugene Thomas Heiner (August 20, 1852 – 1901) was an American architect who designed numerous courthouses, county jails, and other public buildings in Texas.  He was born in New York City, apprenticed in Chicago, and studied further in Germany. His works includes buildings listed on the U.S. National Register of Historic Places.

Early life
Eugene Heiner was born on August 20, 1852 in New York City.

Career
As a teenager, he studied under an architect in Chicago, before moving to Dallas in 1877. He moved to Texas the next year, where he practiced architecture for the rest of his career.

He won a design competition and earned a commission to design the Galveston County Jailhouse. He also designed the Smith County Jail in 1881 and Gonzales County Jail. In addition to designing many Texas jails over the next two decades, he also designed courthouses in Texas. Three of these, the Colorado County Courthouse, Old Brazoria County Courthouse, and the Lavaca County Courthouse, are listed on the National Register of Historic Places. He is also credited with the design of a building at Texas A & M University in College Station, Texas and one at the Texas State Penitentiary in Huntsville, Texas.

Heiner executed various commissions in Galveston and Houston. These included the Blum Building (Galveston), the Kaufman and Runge Building (Galveston), and his best known buildings in Houston: the Houston Cotton Exchange, the W. L. Foley Building, and the Sweeney and Coombs Opera House.

Personal life
In 1878, Heiner married Viola Isenhour. The couple had four daughters.

Death and legacy
Heiner died in Houston on April 26, 1901. He is buried at Glenwood Cemetery in Houston. A marker by the Texas State Historical Commission commemorates his work.

Works

Works include:
Smith County Jail, 1881, 309 Erwin St. Tyler, TX (Heiner, Eugene), NRHP-listed
1884 Houston Cotton Exchange Building (1884), 202 Travis St. Houston, TX (Heiner,Eugene), NRHP-listed
Colorado County Courthouse (1890), Bounded by Milam, Spring, Travis and Walnut Sts. Columbus, TX (Heiner,Eugene T.), NRHP-listed
Wiley J. Croom House, 205 E. Milam Wharton, TX (Heiner, Eugene), NRHP-listed

De Witt County Courthouse, bounded by N. Gonzales, E. Live Oak, N. Clinton, and E. Courthouse Sts. Cuero, TX (Heiner,Eugene), NRHP-listed
W. L. Foley Building (1889 reconstruction), 214—218 Travis St. Houston, TX (Heiner,Eugene T.), NRHP-listed
One or more works in Gonzales Commercial Historic District, roughly bounded by Water, Saint Andrew, Saint Peter, and Saint Matthew Sts. Gonzales, TX (Heiner, Eugene T.,et al.), NRHP-listed
Gonzales County Jail, Courthouse Sq. on St. Lawrence St. Gonzales, TX (Heiner,Eugene T.), NRHP-listed
Jasper County Courthouse (1889), Public Sq. Jasper, TX (Heiner,Eugene T.), NRHP-listed
Lavaca County Courthouse (1897), bounded by LaGrange, 2nd, 3rd, and Main Sts. Hallettsville, TX (Heiner,T.), NRHP-listed

Old Brazoria County Courthouse (1894), Public Sq. Angleton, TX (Heiner,Eugene T.), NRHP-listed

References

External links

Texas Courthouses on Texas Escapes.com

1852 births
1901 deaths
Architects from New York City
Architects from Texas
Architecture in Texas
Architects from Houston